Noni the Pony is a 2010 children's picture book by Alison Lester. It is about a day with a friendly, caring pony called Noni and her friends, Dave dog, and Coco the cat.

Publication history
2010, Australia, Allen & Unwin 
2012, USA, Beach Lane Books

Reception
Booklist wrote, in a review of Noni the Pony, "The graphic art, with its soft, round shapes and soothing, textured background colors, will appeal to small children, as will the cheery couplets." and Kirkus Reviews described Noni as "the perfect pony for preschoolers", and Lester's illustrations as "droll". 

Noni the Pony has also been reviewed by The New York Times, School Library Journal, Horn Book Guide Reviews, Books+Publishing, Publishers Weekly, Educating Young Children, Every Child, Magpies, Reading Time, and Scan.

See also
Noni the Pony Goes to the Beach
Noni the Pony Rescues a Joey

References

External links

Library holdings of Noni the Pony

2010 children's books
Australian picture books
Fictional horses
Children's poetry books
Allen & Unwin books
Pony books